Senator Luther may refer to:

Bill Luther (born 1945), Minnesota State Senate
Sidney A. von Luther (1925–1985), New York State Senate